Love Classics was a Marvel comic series, published in 1949.

Notes

1949 books